The Gufa Volcano is a volcanic field located in the Southern Red Sea Region of Eritrea near the border with Djibouti. The peak elevation is 600 m where lava flows are visible. The last eruption of the volcano was inferred to be during the Holocene era.

See also
 List of volcanoes in Eritrea

References

External links
 Volcanoes of Eritrea

Mountains of Eritrea
Volcanoes of Eritrea
Volcanic fields